Tyler Lake is a lake in Le Sueur County, in the U.S. state of Minnesota.

Tyler Lake was named after William L. Tyler, a pioneer who settled at the lake in 1858.

References

Lakes of Minnesota
Lakes of Le Sueur County, Minnesota